Thallarcha epiostola is a moth in the subfamily Arctiinae. It was described by Turner in 1926. It is found in Australia, where it has been recorded from Tasmania, New South Wales and Victoria.

References

Moths described in 1926
Lithosiini